James Benjamin Seymour (28 November 1867 – 11 June 1950), of Great Britain, was a philatelist who created an award winning collection, and who wrote some of the key works in British philately.

Collecting interests
Seymour collected stamps of Great Britain and created a collection of stamps and postal history of that country that won numerous awards at national and international exhibitions.

After his death, his collection was auctioned by Robson Lowe.

Philatelic literature
James Seymour contributed the section on British line engraved stamps in the Kohl Briefmarken-Handbuch, published in Germany in 1923. He and the editor, Dr Herbert Munk jointly received the Sieger Medal in 1931 for the best philatelic work in the German language that year. Seymour was also the author of Stamps of Great Britain: The Line-engraved Issues, 1840 to 1853. He completed a revised edition of the book in 1950.

Philatelic activity
Seymour was active within the philatelic community. He served both the International Philatelic Union and the Royal Philatelic Society London as president. And, at the l'Academie de Philatélie, he was elected as a corresponding member. Seymour was also a member of the Fiscal Philatelic Society.

Honors and awards
James Benjamin Seymour received numerous philatelic awards from his and other countries. He signed the Roll of Distinguished Philatelists in 1931 and was named to the American Philatelic Society Hall of Fame in 1951.

Outside philately 
Seymour was a President of The Magic Circle.

See also
 Philately
 Philatelic literature

References

1950 deaths
Philatelic literature
British philatelists
Presidents of the Royal Philatelic Society London
1867 births
Signatories to the Roll of Distinguished Philatelists
American Philatelic Society